Jean-Claude Joseph "J. C." Bergeron (born October 14, 1968) is a Canadian former professional ice hockey goaltender 

Bergeron was drafted 104th overall in the 1988 NHL Entry Draft by the Montreal Canadiens and started his National Hockey League career with the Canadiens in 1990.  He would also play for the Los Angeles Kings and Tampa Bay Lightning.

External links

1968 births
Living people
Atlanta Knights players
Fredericton Canadiens players
Ice hockey people from Quebec
Los Angeles Kings players
Montreal Canadiens draft picks
Montreal Canadiens players
People from Baie-Comeau
Peoria Rivermen (IHL) players
Phoenix Roadrunners (IHL) players
Shawinigan Cataractes players
Sherbrooke Canadiens players
Tampa Bay Lightning players
Verdun Junior Canadiens players
Canadian ice hockey goaltenders